The 6mm BR is a centerfire cartridge created for benchrest shooting. The cartridge is also known as the 6mm Bench Rest or simply 6 BR, and has also developed a following among varmint hunters because of its efficiency. There are two basic variants of very similar dimensions, known as the 6mm BR Remington and the 6mm Norma BR.

Cartridge history

Soon after the introduction of the .308 Winchester-based wildcat .308×1.5" Barnes cartridge, wildcatters and experimenters began developing their own wildcats based on .308 Winchester. By 1963 there were several .22 (5.56 mm) and .24 (6 mm) caliber cartridges based on the Barnes’ cartridge.  The new cartridges’ accuracy and efficiency was noticed by the bench rest shooting community. The .24 caliber (6 mm) cartridge version became known as the 6mm Bench Rest or the 6mm BR due to its widespread use in the sport of bench rest shooting.

Because the cartridge was a wildcat and was not standardized until several years later, several variations of the cartridge existed. Cases required fire forming in the chamber as chambers of the rifles varied from one to another. Several 6mm BR variants exist apart from the Remington and Norma versions: the 6mm BRX, 6mm Dasher, 6 mm BRBS 6 mm UBL.

6mm BR Remington
In 1978 Remington started manufacturing their Remington 40-X rifle in the 6mm BR and named their version of the cartridge the 6mm Bench Rest Remington. By 1988 Remington was also manufacturing ammunition. Remington continues to offer the 6mm BR Remington in the 40-X series rifles.  The Remington version of this cartridge is now considered to be obsolete.

6mm Norma BR
In 1996 Norma of Sweden introduced the 6mm Norma BR  which was dimensionally similar to the 6mm BR Remington.
However the chamber of the Norma version provided a longer throat making allowances for the seating of very low drag (VLD) bullets. It was designed from the beginning to optimize accuracy, barrel life, and case capacity in a 6 mm cartridge for  target shooting. As such it couples a sensible case volume (2.45 ml) to bore area (29.52 mm2/0.2952 cm2) ratio with ample space for loading relatively long slender projectiles that can provide good aerodynamic efficiency and external ballistic performance for the projectile diameter.
This is the most common variation of the cartridge used today.

The 6mm Norma BR has become a popular chambering in match rifles used in  ISSF and CISM and other 300 metres rifle disciplines.

Design
The 6mm BR Remington cartridge is a .308×1.5" Barnes cartridge necked down to accommodate .243 bullets. It is one of the earlier cartridges to follow the short, fat design concept. Short fat cartridges have characteristics that make them more efficient and accurate.

6mm Norma BR
The 6mm Norma BR cartridge was introduced by Norma in 1996. This required a much longer throat in rifles chambered for the Norma cartridge.

See also
 List of rifle cartridges
 6 mm caliber

References

External links
 6mmBR.com - 6mm BR Rifle Shooting and Reloading Information
 6mm BR Remington page at ChuckHawks.com

Pistol and rifle cartridges
Remington Arms cartridges